Runyenjes Constituency is an electoral constituency in Kenya that was established for the 1988 elections. It is one of four constituencies of Embu County.

Members of Parliament

Locations and wards

References 

Constituencies in Eastern Province (Kenya)
1988 establishments in Kenya
Constituencies established in 1988
Constituencies in Embu County